Brocchinia uaipanensis is a species of bromeliad (family Bromeliaceae) endemic to southern Venezuela. It has been treated as the sole species in the genus Ayensua under the synonym Ayensua uaipanensis, but Ayensua is now included in Brocchinia. The species was first described in 1957 by Bassett Maguire as Barbacenia uaipanensis.

References 

Bromeliaceae
Flora of Venezuela
Plants described in 1957